The San Juan River is, together with the Jáchal, the most important river of the Argentine province of San Juan. Both join the Desaguadero/Colorado system that ends at the Atlantic Ocean.

Course 
The river starts near the town of Calingasta, in the southwest of the province, from the confluence of three main rivers: the Calingasta River, the Castaño Viejo River, and the Río de los Patos.

From Calingasta the river flows eastwards feeding the Los Caracoles, Punta Negra and Quebrada de Ullum Dams (Embalse Quebrada de Ullum) located near San Juan city, from which it continues south-eastwards receiving a few more tributaries, including the Mendoza River, to later join the Desaguadero River near the Salina Pampa de las Latas (or Salina Bermejo), at the common border of the provinces of San Juan, Mendoza and San Luis.

The upper course of the river is used for water sports such as rafting and fishing, and windsurfing and swimming at the Ullum Dam. Along its entire length, the San Juan River is heavily used for irrigation.

External links

Rivers of Argentina
Rivers of San Juan Province, Argentina